The Italian Dynamic Shooting Federation, Italian Federazione Italiana Tiro Dinamico Sportivo, is the Italian association for practical shooting under the International Practical Shooting Confederation. FITDS has been a part of CONI since 2010.

External links 
 Official homepage of the Italian Dynamic Shooting Federation

References 

Regions of the International Practical Shooting Confederation
Sports organisations of Italy